Benet Lake (also Renet Lake) is a community in the village of Salem Lakes in Kenosha County, Wisconsin, United States. It is located north of Antioch, Illinois. The community takes its name from the Benedictine Fathers, who own the south side of Benet Lake and established a monastery/seminary in 1945.

References

Populated places in Kenosha County, Wisconsin
Neighborhoods in Wisconsin